The Weihrauch HW 45 is an air pistol manufactured by Weihrauch & Weihrauch in Germany and originally developed as a collaboration between American importer Robert Beeman and Weihrauch. It is more commonly known in North America as the Beeman P-1 after the US importers and is a large, full power air pistol with an ambidextrous grip, available in three different calibres: .177, .20 (as a special order) and .22.  The HW 45 is suitable for informal target shooting and plinking.

Specifications
 Weight: 1.15kg (2.54lbs)
 Cocking Effort: 
 Overall Length: 28cm (11inches)
 Barrel Length: 17cm (6.6inches)
 Muzzle energy: 5.1  ft•lbf (6.8 J)

Details
The HW 45 is a spring powered, single-shot, air pistol with spring compression being achieved via an overarm cocking lever incorporating the barrel. The HW 45 features an adjustable two-stage trigger, fibre optic open sights and a grooved 11mm dovetail rail for mounting an optical sight.  The pistol has a manual safety catch & comes in four different levels of finish with all but the basic HW45 having contoured wood laminate grips.  Its design was based on the Colt Government, M1911 and the rear hammer acts as the release, for the overarm cocking lever

The different power levels are created by cocking the gun to different lock points.

References

External links
 Dave Hoffman -  Weihrauch HW45 (Beeman p1) overview
 The HW45 at Weihrauch.co.uk
 HW45 Manual

Air pistols
Air guns